The 1959 Idaho Vandals football team represented the University of Idaho in the 1959 NCAA University Division football season. Led by sixth-year head coach Skip Stahley, the Vandals were an independent in the NCAA's University Division and had a 1–9 record. Two home games were played on campus at Neale Stadium in Moscow, with one in Boise at old Bronco Stadium at Boise Junior College.

The Pacific Coast Conference disbanded in the spring, and Idaho was an independent in football for the next six seasons. They played ten games for the first time; the first six were on the road, and two games were played at night (at Arizona and Pacific).

The Vandals suffered a fifth straight loss in the Battle of the Palouse with neighbor Washington State; Idaho led at halftime, but fell  at Rogers Field  In the rivalry game with Montana at Neale Stadium, the Vandals narrowly retained the Little Brown Stein in the finale to avoid going 

After this season, Stahley took on the dual role of athletic director

Schedule

All-Coast

No Vandals made the All-Coast team or the second team. Honorable mention were end Jim Norton and tackle Jim Prestel;
both went on to lengthy pro careers.

NFL Draft
Two seniors from the 1959 Vandals were selected in the 1960 NFL Draft:

One fifth-year senior was previously selected in the 1959 NFL Draft:

List of Idaho Vandals in the NFL Draft

References

External links
Gem of the Mountains: 1960 University of Idaho yearbook – 1959 football season
Go Mighty Vandals – 1959 football season
Official game program: Idaho at Washington State –  October 24, 1959
Idaho Argonaut – student newspaper – 1959 editions

Idaho
Idaho Vandals football seasons
Idaho Vandals football